Jonathan Stanbury (born 8 March 1951) is a British fencer. He competed in the individual and team épée events at the 1984 Summer Olympics.

References

External links
 

1951 births
Living people
British male fencers
Olympic fencers of Great Britain
Fencers at the 1984 Summer Olympics